The Philippine gray flying fox (Pteropus speciosus) is a species of flying fox in the family Pteropodidae. It is found in Indonesia and the Philippines. Its natural habitat is subtropical or tropical dry forests.

References

Pteropus
Bats of Southeast Asia
Bats of Indonesia
Mammals of the Philippines
Mammals described in 1908
Taxa named by Knud Andersen
Taxonomy articles created by Polbot